Karina Sumner-Smith is a Toronto-based fantasy author. Her short fiction appears in magazines such as Strange Horizons, Lady Churchill's Rosebud Wristlet, and Fantasy, as well as various anthologies. Her story "An End to All Things" was a finalist for the 2006 Nebula Award. She is a graduate of both York University and the Clarion Writers Workshop (2001).

References

External links
 Karina Sumner-Smith official website
 "An End To All Things" by Karina Sumner-Smith (Nebula Award Finalist)
 "Drowned Men Can't Have Kids" by Karina Sumner-Smith
 

Canadian fantasy writers
Living people
Year of birth missing (living people)
Canadian women short story writers